The Siege of Babylon is a 1677 tragedy by the English writer Samuel Pordage. It was originally staged at the Dorset Garden Theatre by the Duke's Company.

The original cast included Thomas Betterton as Orontes, Matthew Medbourne as Lysimachus, Thomas Jevon as  Eumenes, John Crosby as Ptolomy, William Smith as Perdicas, Henry Harris as Cassander, Henry Norris as Araxis, Mary Betterton as Statira, Mary Lee as Roxana and Anne Quin as Thalestris.

References

Bibliography
 Van Lennep, W. The London Stage, 1660-1800: Volume One, 1660-1700. Southern Illinois University Press, 1960.

1677 plays
West End plays
Tragedy plays
Plays by Samuel Pordage